Lambda Literary Awards (also known as the "Lammys") are awarded yearly by the United States-based Lambda Literary Foundation to published works that celebrate or explore LGBT (lesbian, gay, bisexual, transgender) themes. To qualify, a book must have been published in the United States in the year current to the official year of the award; the presentation ceremony is held a year later. The Lambda Literary Foundation states that its mission is "to celebrate LGBT literature and provide resources for writers, readers, booksellers, publishers, and librarians - the whole literary community."

Since their inception in 1989, awards have been given in various categories in fiction and non-fiction. The category for speculative fiction works has changed several times; from science fiction and mystery, to science fiction and fantasy, and finally to LGBT Sci-Fi, fantasy and horror.

Eligibility guidelines
To be eligible for the award, texts must meet the following requirements:

 The book must have been published for the first time in the United States in the previous calendar year between January 1 and December 31.
 The book must be published in English; translations are accepted.
 Self-published books are eligible, though book published on social media platforms (e.g., blogs or Wattpad) are not. If a book formerly published on such platforms is formally published, it is then eligible.

As with other Lambda Literary Awards, the books nominated for the Lambda Literary Award for Science Fiction, Fantasy and Horror are judged based on literary merit. As such, the gender and/or sexual identity doesn't matter. Furthermore, authors may be in any stage of their career to be eligible for this award.

This category is awarded books that qualify as science fiction, fantasy, horror, and related genres and is open to submissions in the form of novels, novellas, and short stories collections.

Winners and nominees

In the following table, the years correspond to the year of the book's release; the ceremonies are always held the following year. Entries with a yellow background have won the relevant award; those with a white background are the nominees.  Categories are abbreviated, the official category titles are presented in the key.

Key

Recipients
Multi-time winners of the award include Melissa Scott (4), Nicola Griffith (3), Jim Grimsley (2), and Stephen Pagel (2). Nicola Griffith holds the record for most nominations (6), and Perry Brass has the most nominations without winning (4).

 Also jointly won Gay Men's Small Press Book Award. Also nominated for Gay Men's Mystery. Also jointly won Lesbian Fiction. Also won Lesbian fiction. Also nominated for Drama. Also nominated for Gay Men's Mystery. Also nominated for Gay Men's Anthology-Fiction. Also nominated for Gay Men's Anthology-Fiction. Also nominated for Gay Fiction.

See also

Gaylactic Spectrum Awards
Homosexuality in speculative fiction
Sex and sexuality in speculative fiction

References

External links
Lambda Literary Foundation

Fantasy awards
Horror fiction awards
Science Fiction
LGBT speculative fiction
Lists of LGBT-related award winners and nominees
Lists of speculative fiction-related award winners and nominees
Science fiction awards
English-language literary awards